Uruguay remained neutral for most of World War II. The policy of President Alfredo Baldomir, leading the Colorado Party, was to support the Allied cause, but from a neutral base. Great Britain retained considerable influence with the Baldomir regime, largely through the efforts of Sir Eugen Millington-Drake, who was the British Minister in Montevideo from 1934 to 1941. In January 1942, Baldomir terminated diplomatic relations with the Axis powers. He resigned in 1943 and his neutrality policy was continued by his successor Juan José de Amézaga, also of the Colorado Party. In February 1945, having signed the Declaration by United Nations, Amézaga declared war on Germany and Japan.

Pre-war German colonial plans
Before war broke out in Europe, the German government planned a coup and invasion of Uruguay to turn the country into a German colony. Supported by local Nazis and led by Arnulf Fuhrmann and run out of the German embassy in Montevideo, the plan never came to fruition, as its leadership was uncovered and arrested.

Baldomir's wartime policy
After the Second World War began, there was a considerable rise in European demand for Uruguay's key products such as meat, wool and leather. The country prospered and was able to shake off the impact of the Great Depression, especially as its manufacturing base expanded in response to the increased demand. President Alfredo Baldomir adopted a pro-British stance although he insisted that Uruguay remained neutral militarily. His government had proposed nationalisation of certain foreign enterprises, mostly British, and Baldomir vetoed these as well as deliberately earmarking meat supplies for export to Great Britain.

Admiral Graf Spee
On 13 December 1939, the Battle of the River Plate took place off the coast of Uruguay between a British Royal Navy squadron and the German "pocket battleship" . All four vessels suffered damage and the Graf Spee took refuge in Montevideo harbour. Negotiations began about its status as an active belligerent taking shelter in a neutral country. Millington-Drake played a significant role, making full use of his influence with the Uruguayan government. After a 72-hour layover, the captain of Admiral Graf Spee, having been led to believe that he was hopelessly outnumbered by British reinforcements, ordered the ship to be scuttled in the River Plate estuary. Most of the surviving crew of 1,150 were interned in Uruguay and Argentina and many remained after the war. 

A German Embassy official in Uruguay said his government had sent an official letter stating its claims to ownership of the salvage. Any such claim was already invalid because, early in 1940, the Nazi government had sold salvaging rights to the vessel to a Uruguayan businessman who was acting on behalf of the British government but, in any event, salvaging rights would have expired under Uruguayan law. 

In June 1940, Germany threatened to break off diplomatic relations with Uruguay. Germany protested that Uruguay had given safe harbour to  after it was attacked by a German raider. The ship was repaired with steel plate reportedly salvaged from Admiral Graf Spee.

Declaration of war
On 25 January 1942, Uruguay terminated diplomatic relations with Nazi Germany, one of 21 South and Central American nations to do so (Argentina did not). In 1945, Uruguay formally signed the Declaration by United Nations and then finally declared war on Germany and Japan on 23 February 1945.

See also
 Latin America during World War II

References

 
Neutral states in World War II